Ferreira Gomes is a municipality located in the center of the state of Amapá in Brazil. The town began as the military headquarters of Pedro II and was founded by João Ferreira Gomes. In 1989, it became an independent municipality.

Nature 
The municipality contains 3.64% of the  Amapá State Forest, a sustainable use conservation unit established in 2006.
It also contains 44.07% of the  Amapá National Forest, a sustainable use conservation unit created in 1989.

Economy 

The economy is mainly based on agriculture and livestock in particular cattle and buffalo. The main agricultural products are cassava, corn and bananas. In the 1970s, pine plantations were established for the pulp industry. Ferreira Gomes is located on the BR-156 highway.

Hydroelectric Plant 

The Coaracy Nunes Hydroelectric Plant (Usina Hidrelétrica Coaracy Nunes) is a hydroelectric power plant located on the Araguari River. It is near Vila do Paredão. Construction started in the 1960s, and was completed in 1978. The plant consists of a 24.9 km2 dam. Originally it only supplied to cities of Macapá and Santana, but was later expanded for the whole region. In 2015, the output was 78 MW.

References

External links 
 Official site (in Portuguese)
 

Municipalities in Amapá
Populated places in Amapá